The Barrie Public Library is the library system in Barrie, Ontario, Canada. The Downtown Branch is located at 60 Worsley Street in downtown Barrie, near City Hall. The Painswick Branch is located at 48 Dean Avenue, near Yonge Street and Big Bay Point Road.

History
The library system was incorporated in 1862, and the first reading room was established in 1871.

Services
Information and reference services 
Access to full text databases 
Community information 
Internet access 
Reader's advisory services 
Programs for children, youth and adults

See also
Ask Ontario
List of Carnegie libraries in Canada

References

External links

Municipal government of Barrie
Public libraries in Ontario
Buildings and structures in Barrie
Education in Barrie
Library buildings completed in 1996
Library buildings completed in 2011
1862 establishments in Canada
Libraries established in 1862